Sunkist Kids is a wrestling club and nonprofit organization based in Scottsdale, Arizona.

History
Founded in 1976, Sunkist Kids has produced 55 Olympic medalists since its inception.  Many of American wrestling's greatest champions are from the organization, such as wrestling legend John Smith (two-time Olympic gold medalist and four-time world champion), women's wrestling pioneer Tricia Saunders (four-time world champion), Cael Sanderson (2004 Olympic gold medalist), and Greco-Roman wrestler Rulon Gardner (2000 Olympic heavyweight gold medalist). The head coach is currently Mark Perry.

Since 1976, the Sunkist Kids Wrestling Club has produced more Olympic, world, and U.S. national champions than any other elite wrestling club in the United States. To date, the Sunkist Kids have 55 Olympic and world medals and 164 national champions. 

Dan Severn was the original Sunkist Kid of the Sunkist Kids.

References

External links
Official site

Wrestling
Amateur wrestling
Scholastic wrestling
Freestyle wrestling
Wrestling clubs